David Bruce Crouch,  (born 31 October 1953) is a British historian and academic. From 2000 until his retirement in 2018 he was Professor of Medieval History at the University of Hull.

Academia
He graduated in history from the former University College, Cardiff, in 1975, and pursued a career in secondary school teaching in Mountain Ash, South Wales till 1983. While serving as a schoolteacher he completed a doctorate on the Anglo-Norman twin aristocrats, Waleran of Meulan and Robert of Leicester, subsequently published by Cambridge University Press. From 1984 he occupied research posts in the University of London until moving to a teaching position in North Riding College, later University College, Scarborough in 1990. In 2000 he transferred to the Department of History in the University of Hull as professor of medieval history. He has occupied visiting professorships in Poitiers and Milwaukee. From 2013 he held a Leverhulme Trust Major Research Fellowship and in 2015 he was a member of the Institute for Advanced Study, Princeton.

Corpus of work
Professor Crouch's main focus is on the social and political history of the period from 1000 to 1300, primarily in England and France, with a particular emphasis on comparative studies of social structures between the various realms of Britain and continental France. His fullest statement on his theory that it was the formulation of nobility as a self-conscious aristocratic quality demanding social deference is to be found in his 2005 work The Birth of Nobility. His idea is that once nobility was a quality that could be acquired and demonstrated by conduct and lifestyle as much as by birth, a cascade effect was triggered which produced a hierarchy of social classes organised by relative degrees of nobility, such as the hearth son of a knight. He sees this as happening in the generations on either side of the year 1200.

From the beginning of his career he has also published on the medieval history of South East Wales and the diocese of Llandaff.

In political history he has written influential biographies on King Stephen and William Marshal. He was a member of the academic team which edited and translated into English the contemporary medieval biography of Marshal

His books on the aristocracy of England and France in the High Middle Ages, have been characterised by his incorporation of English social history into the mainstream of continental scholarship.

Honours
In 1986, Crouch was elected a Fellow of the Royal Historical Society (FRHistS). In 2014, he was elected a Fellow of the British Academy (FBA), the United Kingdom's national academy for the humanities and social sciences.

Books

 2nd edition 2002.

 (volume 2 in the Cambridge History of Britain series)

References

External links
 Biography at the University of Hull home page

1953 births
Living people
British medievalists
Academics of the University of Hull
Fellows of the British Academy
Fellows of the Royal Historical Society
Contributors to the Victoria County History